The Black Seminoles, or Afro-Seminoles are Native American-Africans associated with the Seminole people in Florida and Oklahoma. They are mostly blood descendants of the Seminole people, free Africans, and escaped slaves, who allied with Seminole groups in Spanish Florida. Many have Seminole lineage, but due to the stigma of having very dark or brown skin and kinky hair, they all have been categorized as slaves or freedmen.

Historically, the Black Seminoles lived mostly in distinct bands near the Native American Seminole. Some were held as slaves, particularly of Seminole leaders, but the Black Seminole had more freedom than did slaves held by whites in the South and by other Native American tribes, including the right to bear arms.

Today, Black Seminole descendants live primarily in rural communities around the Seminole Nation of Oklahoma. Its two Freedmen's bands, the Caesar Bruner Band and the Dosar Barkus Band, are represented on the General Council of the Nation. Other centers are in Florida, Texas, the Bahamas, and northern Mexico.

Since the 1930s, the Seminole Freedmen have struggled with cycles of exclusion from the Seminole Tribe of Oklahoma. In 1990, the tribe received the majority of a $46 million judgement trust by the United States, for seizure of lands in Florida in 1823, and the Freedmen have worked to gain a share of it. In 2004 the US Supreme Court ruled the Seminole Freedmen could not bring suit without the Seminole Nation of Oklahoma, which refused to join them on the claim issue. In 2000 the Seminole Nation voted to restrict membership to those who could prove descent from a Seminole on the Dawes Rolls of the early 20th century, which excluded about 1,200 Freedmen who were previously included as members. They argue that the Dawes Rolls were inaccurate and often classified persons with both Seminole and African ancestry as only Freedmen.

Origins
The Spanish strategy for defending their claim of Florida at first was based on forcing the local Indian tribes into a mission system. The Native Americans in the missions were to serve as a militia to protect the colony from incursions from the neighboring colony of South Carolina. However, due to a combination of raids by South Carolinan colonists and newly introduced European diseases to which the Indians had no immunity, Florida's native population was quickly decimated.  After the local Native Americans had all but died out, Spanish authorities encouraged Native Americans and runaway slaves from the Southern colonies to move to their territory. The Spanish hoped that the increased number of inhabitants of Spanish Florida would be effective in case of potential raids by American colonists.

As early as 1689, enslaved Africans fled from the South Carolina Lowcountry to Spanish Florida seeking freedom. These were people who gradually formed what has become known as the Gullah culture of the coastal Southeast. Under an edict from King Charles II of Spain in 1693, the black fugitives received liberty in exchange for defending the Spanish settlers at St. Augustine. The Spanish organized the black volunteers into a militia; their settlement at Fort Mosé, founded in 1738, was the first legally sanctioned free black town in North America.

Not all the slaves escaping south found military service in St. Augustine to their liking.  More escaped slaves sought refuge in wilderness areas in northern Florida, where their knowledge of tropical agriculture—and resistance to tropical diseases—served them well.  Most of the black people who pioneered Florida were Gullah people who escaped from the rice plantations of South Carolina (and later Georgia). As Gullah, they had developed an Afro-English based Creole, along with cultural practices and African leadership structure. The Gullah pioneers built their own settlements based on rice and corn agriculture. They became allies of Creek and other Native Americans escaping into Florida from the Southeast at the same time. In Florida, they developed the Afro-Seminole Creole, which they spoke with the growing Seminole tribe.

Following the Treaty of Paris signed in 1763 at the conclusion of the Seven Years' War, Spanish Florida was ceded to the Kingdom of Great Britain. The area remained a sanctuary for fugitive slaves from the Southern colonies, as it was lightly settled. Many slaves sought refuge near growing Native American settlements.

In 1773, when the American naturalist William Bartram visited the area, he referred to the Seminole as a distinct people, their name apparently coming from the word "simanó-li", which according to John Reed Swanton, "is applied by the Creeks to people who remove from populous towns and live by themselves.". William C. Sturtevant says the ethnonym was borrowed by Muskogee from the Spanish word cimarrón, supposedly the source as well of the English word maroon used to describe the runaway slave communities of Florida and of the Great Dismal Swamp on the border of Virginia and North Carolina, on colonial islands of the Caribbean, and other parts of the New World. Linguist Leo Spitzer, however, writing in the journal Language, says, "If there is a connection between Eng. maroon, Fr. marron, and Sp. cimarron, Spain (or Spanish America) probably gave the word directly to England (or English America)."
 
Florida had been a refuge for fugitive slaves for at least 70 years by the time of the American Revolution. Communities of black Seminoles were established on the outskirts of major Seminole towns. A new influx of freedom-seeking black people reached Florida during the American Revolution (1775–83), escaping during the disruption of war. During the Revolution, the Seminole allied with the British, and African Americans and Seminole came into increased contact with each other. The Seminole held some slaves, as did the Creek and other Southeast Native American tribes. During the War of 1812, members of both communities sided with the British against the US in the hopes of repelling American settlers; they strengthened their internal ties and earned the enmity of American general Andrew Jackson.

Spain had given land to some Muscogee (Creek) Native Americans. Over time the Creek were joined by other remnant groups of Southeast American Native Americans, such as the Miccosukee, Choctaw, and the Apalachicola, and formed communities. Their community evolved over the late 18th and early 19th centuries as waves of Creek left present-day Georgia and Alabama under pressure from white settlement and the Creek Wars. By a process of ethnogenesis, the Native Americans formed the Seminole.

Culture

The black Seminole culture that took shape after 1800 was a dynamic mixture of African, Native American, Spanish, and slave traditions. Adopting certain practices of the Native Americans,  maroons wore Seminole clothing and ate the same foodstuffs prepared the same way: they gathered the roots of a native plant called coontie, grinding, soaking, and straining them to make a starchy flour similar to arrowroot, as well as mashing corn with a mortar and pestle to make sofkee, a sort of porridge often used as a beverage, with water added— ashes from the fire wood used to cook the sofkee were occasionally added to it for extra flavor. They also introduced their Gullah staple of rice to the Seminole, and continued to use it as a basic part of their diets. Rice remained part of the diet of the black Seminoles who moved to Oklahoma. In addition, the language of the black Seminoles is a mix of African, Seminole, and Spanish words. The African heritage of the black Seminoles, according to academics, is from the Kongo, Yoruba, and other African ethnic groups. African American linguist and historian, Lorenzo Dow Turner documented about fifteen words spoken by black Seminoles that came from the Kikongo language. Other African words spoken by black Seminoles are from the Twi, Wolof, and other West African languages.

Initially living apart from the Native Americans, the maroons developed their own unique African-American culture, based in the Gullah culture of the Lowcountry. black Seminoles inclined toward a syncretic form of Christianity developed during the plantation years. Certain cultural practices, such as "jumping the broom" to celebrate marriage, hailed from the plantations; other customs, such as some names used for black towns, reflected African heritage.

As time progressed, the Seminole and blacks had limited intermarriage, but historians and anthropologists have come to believe that generally the black Seminoles had independent communities. They allied with the Seminole at times of war.

The Seminole society was based on a matrilineal kinship system, in which inheritance and descent went through the maternal line. Children were considered to belong to the mother's clan, so those born to ethnic African mothers would have been considered black by the Seminole. While the children might integrate customs from both parents' cultures, the Seminole believed they belonged to the mother's group more than the father's. African Americans adopted some elements of the European-American patriarchal system. But, under the South's adoption of the principle of partus sequitur ventrem in the 17th century and incorporated into slavery law in slave states, children of slave mothers were considered legally slaves. Under the Fugitive Slave Law of 1850, even if the mother escaped to a free state, she and her children were legally considered slaves and fugitives. As a result, the black Seminoles born to slave mothers were always at risk from slave raiders.

African-Seminole relations
By the early 19th century, maroons (free Black people and runaway slaves) and the Seminole were in regular contact in Florida, where they evolved a system of relations unique among North American Native Americans and Black people. Seminole practice in Florida had acknowledged slavery, though not on the chattel slavery model then common in the American south. It was, in fact, more like feudal dependency and taxation since African Americans among the Seminole generally lived in their own communities.

In exchange for paying an annual tribute of livestock, crops, hunting, and war party obligations, Black prisoners or fugitives found sanctuary among the Seminole. Seminoles, in turn, acquired an important strategic ally in a sparsely-populated region. They elected their own leaders, and could amass wealth in cattle and crops. Most importantly, they bore arms for self-defense. Florida real estate records show that the Seminole and Black Seminole people owned large quantities of Florida land. In some cases, a portion of that Florida land is still owned by the Seminole and black Seminole descendants in Florida. In the 19th century, the Black Seminoles were called "Seminole Negroes" by their white American enemies and Estelusti ("black People"), by their Native American allies.

Under the comparatively free conditions, the Black Seminoles flourished. US Army Lieutenant George McCall recorded his impressions of a Black Seminole community in 1826:

We found these negroes in possession of large fields of the finest land, producing large crops of corn, beans, melons, pumpkins, and other esculent vegetables.... I saw, while riding along the borders of the ponds, fine rice growing; and in the village large corn-cribs were filled, while the houses were larger and more comfortable than those of the Native Americans themselves.

Historians estimate that during the 1820s, 800 blacks were living with the Seminoles. The Black Seminole settlements were highly militarized, unlike the communities of most of the slaves in the Deep South. The military nature of the African and Seminole relationship led General Edmund Pendleton Gaines, who visited several flourishing black Seminole settlements in the 1800s, to describe the African Americans as "vassals and allies" of the Seminole.

The traditional relationship between Seminole Blacks and natives changed in the course of the Second Seminole War when the old tribal system broke down and the Seminole resolved themselves into loose war bands living off the land with no distinction between tribal members and Black fugitives. That changed again in the new territory when the Seminole were obliged to settle on fixed lots of land and take up settled agriculture. Conflict arose in the territory because the transplanted Seminole had been placed on land allocated to the Creek, who had a practice of chattel slavery. There was increasing pressure from both Creek and pro-Creek Seminole for the adoption of the Creek model of slavery for the Black Seminoles. Creek slavers and those from other Native groups, and whites, began raiding the Black Seminole settlements to kidnap and enslave people. The Seminole leadership would become headed by a pro-Creek faction who supported the institution of chattel slavery. These threats led to many Black Seminoles escaping to Mexico.

In terms of spirituality, the ethnic groups remained distinct. The Seminole followed the nativistic principles of their Great Spirit. Black enslaved people had a syncretic form of Christianity brought with them from the plantations. In general, the Black former-slaves never wholly adopted Seminole culture and beliefs but were accepted into Seminole society, as seen by the skin tone in the pictures of the early 1900s. They were not considered Native American by the middle of the 20th century.

Most Black former-slaves spoke Gullah, an Afro-English-based creole language. That enabled them to communicate better with Anglo-Americans than the Creek or Mikasuki-speaking Seminole. The Native Americans used them as translators to advance their trading with the British and other tribes. Together, in Florida, they developed Afro-Seminole Creole, identified in 1978 as a distinct language by the linguist Ian Hancock. Black Seminoles and Freedmen continued to speak Afro-Seminole Creole through the 19th century in Oklahoma. Hancock found that in 1978, some Black Seminole and Seminole elders still spoke it in Oklahoma and in Florida.

Seminole Wars
After winning independence in the Revolution, American slaveholders were increasingly worried about the armed black communities in Florida. The territory was ruled again by Spain, as Britain had ceded both East and West Florida. The US slaveholders sought the capture and return of Florida's black fugitives under the Treaty of New York (1790), the first treaty ratified under the Confederation.

Wanting to disrupt Florida's maroon communities after the War of 1812, General Andrew Jackson attacked the Negro Fort, which had become a black Seminole stronghold after the British had allowed them to occupy it when they evacuated Florida. Breaking up the maroon communities was one of Jackson's major objectives in the First Seminole War (1817–18).

Under pressure, the Native American and black communities moved into south and central Florida. Slaves and black Seminoles frequently migrated down the peninsula to escape from Cape Florida to the Bahamas. Hundreds left in the early 1820s after the United States acquired the territory from Spain, effective 1821. Contemporary accounts noted a group of 120 migrating in 1821, and a much larger group of 300 African-American slaves escaping in 1823, picked up by Bahamians in 27 sloops and also by canoes. Their concern about living under American rule was not unwarranted. In 1821, Andrew Jackson became the territorial governor of Florida and ordered an attack on Angola, a village built by black Seminoles and other free blacks on the south of Tampa Bay on the Manatee River. Raiders captured over 250 people, most of whom were sold into slavery. Some of the survivors fled to the Florida interior and others to Florida's east coast and escaped to the Bahamas. In the Bahamas, the black Seminoles developed a village known as Red Bays on Andros, where basket making and certain grave rituals associated with Seminole traditions are still practiced. Federal construction and staffing of the Cape Florida Lighthouse in 1825 reduced the number of slave escapes from this site.

 The Second Seminole War (1835–42) marked the height of tension between the U.S. and the Seminoles, and also the historical peak of the African-Seminole alliance. Under the policy of Indian removal, the US wanted to relocate Florida's 4,000 Seminole people and most of their 800 black Seminole allies to the western Indian Territory. During the year before the war, prominent white citizens captured and claimed as fugitive slaves at least 100 black Seminoles.

Anticipating attempts to re-enslave more members of their community, black Seminoles opposed removal to the West. In councils before the war, they threw their support behind the most militant Seminole faction, led by Osceola. After war broke out, individual black leaders, such as John Caesar, Abraham, and John Horse, played key roles. In addition to aiding the natives in their fight, black Seminoles recruited plantation slaves to rebellion at the start of the war. The slaves joined Native Americans and maroons in the destruction of 21 sugar plantations from Christmas Day, December 25, 1835, through the summer of 1836. Historians do not agree on whether these events should be considered a separate slave rebellion; generally they view the attacks on the sugar plantations as part of the Seminole War.

By 1838, U.S. General Thomas Sydney Jesup tried to divide the black and Seminole warriors by offering freedom to the blacks if they surrendered and agreed to removal to Indian Territory. John Horse was among the black warriors who surrendered under this condition. Due to Seminole opposition, however, the Army did not fully follow through on its offer. After 1838, more than 500 black Seminoles traveled with the Seminoles thousands of miles to the Indian Territory in present-day Oklahoma; some traveled by ship across the Gulf of Mexico and up the Mississippi River. Because of harsh conditions, many of both peoples died along this trail from Florida to Oklahoma, also known as The Trail of Tears.

The status of black Seminoles and fugitive slaves was largely unsettled after they reached Indian Territory. The issue was compounded by the government's initially putting the Seminole and blacks under the administration of the Creek Nation, many of whom were slaveholders. The Creek tried to re-enslave some of the fugitive black slaves. John Horse and others set up towns, generally near Seminole settlements, repeating their pattern from Florida.

In the West and Mexico

In the west, the black Seminoles were still threatened by slave raiders. These included pro-slavery members of the Creek tribe and some Seminole, whose allegiance to the blacks diminished after defeat by the US in the war. Officers of the federal army may have tried to protect the black Seminoles, but in 1848 the U.S. Attorney General bowed to pro-slavery lobbyists and ordered the army to disarm the community. This left hundreds of Seminoles and black Seminoles unable to leave the settlement or to defend themselves against slavers.

Migration to Mexico

Facing the threat of enslavement, the black Seminole leader John Horse and about 180 black Seminoles staged a mass escape in 1849 to northern Mexico, where slavery had been abolished twenty years earlier. The black fugitives crossed to freedom in July 1850. They rode with a faction of traditionalist Seminole under the chief Coacochee, who led the expedition. The Mexican government welcomed the Seminole allies as border guards on the frontier, and they settled at Nacimiento, Coahuila.

After 1861, the black Seminoles in Mexico and Texas had little contact with those in Oklahoma. For the next 20 years, black Seminoles served as militiamen and Native American fighters in Mexico, where they became known as mascogos, derived from the tribal name of the Creek – Muskogee. Slave raiders from Texas continued to threaten the community but arms and reinforcements from the Mexican Army enabled the black warriors to defend their community. By the 1940s, descendants of the Mascogos numbered 400–500 in Nacimiento de los Negros, Coahuila, inhabiting lands adjacent to the Kickapoo tribe. They had a thriving agricultural community. By the 1990s, most of the descendants had moved into Texas.

Indian Territory/Oklahoma

Throughout the period, several hundred black Seminoles remained in the Indian Territory (present-day Oklahoma). Because most of the Seminole and the other Five Civilized Tribes supported the Confederacy during the American Civil War, in 1866 the US required new peace treaties with them. The US required the tribes emancipate any slaves and extend to the freedmen full citizenship rights in the tribes if they chose to stay in Indian Territory. In the late nineteenth century, Seminole Freedmen thrived in towns near the Seminole communities on the reservation. Most had not been living as slaves to the Native Americans before the war. They lived —as their descendants still do— in and around Wewoka, Oklahoma, the community founded in 1849 by John Horse as a black settlement. Today it is the capital of the federally recognized Seminole Nation of Oklahoma.

Following the Civil War, some Freedmen's leaders in Indian Territory practiced polygyny, as did ethnic African leaders in other diaspora communities. In 1900 there were 1,000 Freedmen listed in the population of the Seminole Nation in Indian Territory, about one-third of the total. By the time of the Dawes Rolls, there were numerous female-headed households registered. The Freedmen's towns were made up of large, closely connected families.

After allotment, "[f]reedmen, unlike their [Native] peers on the blood roll, were permitted to sell their land without clearing the transaction through the Indian Bureau. That made the poorly educated Freedmen easy marks for white settlers migrating from the Deep South."  Numerous Seminole Freedmen lost their land in the early decades after allotment, and some moved to urban areas. Others left the state because of its conditions of racial segregation. As US citizens, they were exposed to the harsher racial laws of Oklahoma.

Since 1954, the Freedmen have been included in the constitution of the Seminole Nation of Oklahoma. They have two bands, each representing more than one town and named for 19th-century band leaders: the Cesar Bruner band covers towns south of Little River; the Dosar Barkus covers the several towns located north of the river. Each of the bands elects two representatives to the General Council of the Seminole Nation.

Texas community

In 1870, the U.S. Army invited black Seminoles to return from Mexico to serve as army scouts for the United States. The black Seminole Scouts (originally an African American unit despite the name) played a lead role in the Texas-Indian Wars of the 1870s, when they were based at Fort Clark, Texas, the home of the Buffalo Soldiers. The scouts became famous for their tracking abilities and feats of endurance. Four men were awarded the Medal of Honor, three for an 1875 action against the Comanche.

After the close of the Texas Indian Wars, the scouts remained stationed at Fort Clark in Brackettville, Texas. The Army disbanded the unit in 1914. The veterans and their families settled in and around Brackettville, where scouts and family members were buried in its cemetery. The town remains the spiritual center of the Texas-based black Seminoles. In 1981, descendants at Brackettville and the Little River community of Oklahoma met for the first time in more than a century, in Texas for a Juneteenth reunion and celebration.

Florida and Bahamas
Black Seminole descendants continue to live in Florida today. They can enroll in the Seminole Tribe of Florida if they meet its membership criteria for blood quantum: one-quarter Seminole ancestry. About 50 black Seminoles, all of whom have at least one-quarter Seminole ancestry, live on the Fort Pierce Reservation, a 50-acre parcel taken in trust in 1995 by the Department of Interior for the Tribe as its sixth reservation.

Descendants of Black Seminoles, who identify as Bahamian, reside on Andros Island in the Bahamas. A few hundred refugees had left in the early nineteenth century from Cape Florida to go to the British colony for sanctuary from American enslavement. After banning its participation in the Atlantic slave trade in 1807, in 1818 Britain declared that slaves who arrived in the Bahamas from outside the British West Indies would be manumitted. In 1833 Britain abolished slavery throughout its Empire. They have been sometimes referred to as "black Indians", in recognition of their history.

Seminole Freedmen exclusion controversy
In 1900, Seminole Freedmen numbered about 1,000 on the Oklahoma reservation, about one-third of the total population at the time. Members were registered on the Dawes Rolls for allocation of communal land to individual households. Since then, numerous Freedmen left after losing their land, as their land sales were not overseen by the Indian Bureau. Others left because of having to deal with the harshly segregated society of Oklahoma.

The land allotments and participation in Oklahoma society altered relations between the Seminole and Freedmen, particularly after the 1930s. Both peoples faced racial discrimination from whites in Oklahoma, who essentially divided society into two: white and "other". Public schools and facilities were racially segregated.

When the tribe reorganized under the Indian Reorganization Act of 1934, some Seminole wanted to exclude the Freedmen and keep the tribe as Native American only. It was not until the 1950s that the black Seminole were officially recognized in the constitution. Another was adopted in 1969, that restructured the government according to more traditional Seminole lines. It established 14 town bands, of which two represented Freedmen. The two Freedmen's bands were given two seats each, like other bands, on the Seminole General Council.

There have been "battles over tribal membership across the country, as gambling revenues and federal land payments have given Native Americans something to fight over." In 2000, Seminole Freedmen were in the national news because of a legal dispute with the Seminole Nation of Oklahoma, of which they had been legal members since 1866, over membership and rights within the tribe.

The Seminole Nation of Oklahoma held the black Seminoles could not share in services to be provided by a $56 million federal settlement, a judgement trust, originally awarded in 1976 to the Seminole Nation of Oklahoma and the Seminole Tribe of Florida (and other Florida Seminoles) by the federal government. The settlement was in compensation for land taken from them in northern Florida by the United States at the time of the signing of the Treaty of Moultrie Creek in 1823, when most of the Seminole and maroons were moved to a reservation in the center of the territory. This was before removal west of the Mississippi.

The judgement trust was based on the Seminole tribe as it existed in 1823. black Seminoles were not recognized legally as part of the tribe, nor was their ownership or occupancy of land separately recognized. The US government at the time would have assumed most were fugitive slaves, without legal standing. The Oklahoma and Florida groups were awarded portions of the judgement related to their respective populations in the early 20th century, when records were made of the mostly full-blood descendants of the time. The settlement apportionment was disputed in court cases between the Oklahoma and Florida tribes, but finally awarded in 1990, with three-quarters going to the Oklahoma people and one-quarter to those in Florida.

However, the black Seminole descendants asserted their ancestors had also held and farmed land in Florida, and suffered property losses as a result of US actions. They filed suit in 1996 against the Department of Interior to share in the benefits of the judgement trust of the Seminole Nation of Oklahoma, of which they were members.

In another aspect of the dispute over citizenship, in the summer of 2000 the Seminole Nation of Oklahoma voted to restrict members, according to blood quantum, to those who had one-eighth Seminole ancestry, basically those who could document descent from a Seminole ancestor listed on the Dawes Rolls, the federal registry established in the early 20th century. At the time, during rushed conditions, registrars had separate lists for Seminole-Indian and Freedmen. They classified those with visible African ancestry as Freedmen, regardless of their proportion of Native American ancestry or whether they were considered Native members of the tribe at the time. This excluded some black Seminole from being listed on the Seminole-Indian list who qualified by ancestry.

The Dawes Rolls included in the Seminole-Indian list many Intermarried Whites who lived on Native American lands, but did not include blacks of the same status. The Seminole Freedmen believed the tribe's 21st-century decision to exclude them was racially based and has opposed it on those grounds. The Department of Interior said that it would not recognize a Seminole government that did not have Seminole Freedmen participating as voters and on the council, as they had officially been members of the nation since 1866. In October 2000, the Seminole Nation filed its own suit against the Interior Department, contending it had the sovereign right to determine tribal membership.

In April 2002, the Seminole Freedmen's suit against the government was dismissed in federal district court; the court ruled the Freedmen could not bring suit independently of the Seminole Nation of Oklahoma, which refused to join. They appealed to the United States Supreme Court, which in June 2004 affirmed that the Seminole Freedmen could not sue the federal government for inclusion in the settlement without the Seminole Nation joining. As a sovereign nation, they could not be ordered to join the suit.

Later that year, the Bureau of Indian Affairs held that the exclusion of black Seminoles constituted a violation of the Seminole Nation's 1866 treaty with the United States following the American Civil War. They noted that the treaty was made with a tribe that included black as well as white and brown members. The treaty had required the Seminole to emancipate their slaves, and to give the Seminole Freedmen full citizenship and voting rights. The BIA stopped federal funding for a time for services and programs to the Seminole.

The individual Certificate of Degree of Indian Blood (CDIB) is based on registration of ancestors in the Indian lists of the Dawes Rolls. Although the BIA could not issue CDIBs to the Seminole Freedmen, in 2003 the agency recognized them as members of the tribe and advised them of continuing benefits for which they were eligible. Journalists theorized the decision could affect the similar case in which the Cherokee Nation of Oklahoma excluded Cherokee Freedmen as members unless they could document a direct Native American ancestor on the Dawes Rolls.

Legacy and honors

Fort Mose Historic State Park in Florida is a National Historic Landmark at the site of the first free black community in the United States
A large sign at Bill Baggs Cape Florida State Park commemorates the site where hundreds of African Americans escaped to freedom in the Bahamas in the early 1820s, as part of the National Underground Railroad Network to Freedom Trail.
A sign at the Manatee Mineral Spring marks the location where traces of Angola were uncovered
Red Bays, Andros, the historic settlement of black Seminoles in the Bahamas, and Nacimiento, Mexico are being recognized as related international sites on the Network to Freedom Trail.

Notable black Seminoles
Dosar Barkus, band leader from 1892 through allotment, namesake for contemporary band
Cesar Bruner, band leader from Reconstruction through statehood, namesake for contemporary band
Eugene Bullard, one of the first black American military pilots
John Horse, leader at the time of removal, founder of Wewoka, and co-leader of 1849 escape to northern Mexico
Sergeant John Ward
Pompey Factor and Isaac Payne - Medal of Honor recipients for their service in the 24th Infantry.

See also

 Afro-Seminole Creole
 black Indians in the United States
 black Seminole Scouts
 Ian Hancock
 List of topics related to black and African people
 One-Drop Rule
 Zambo

Notes

References

Primary sources
Mahon, John K. (1967). History of the Second Seminole War 1835-1842 (Revised Edition). University of Florida Press.
McCall, George A. Letters From the Frontiers. Philadelphia: Lippincott & Co., 1868.
Miller, David Hunter, ed. Treaties and Other International Acts of the United States of America. 2 vols. Washington: GPO, 1931.
Mills, Charles K. (2011). Harvest of Barren Regrets: The Army Career of Frederick William Benteen 1834–1898. University of Nebraska Press. 
United States. Attorney-General. Official Opinions of the Attorneys General of the United States. Washington: United States, 1852–1870.
United States. Congress. American State Papers: Foreign Relations. Vol 4. Washington: Gales and Seaton, 1832–1860.
United States. Congress. American State Papers: Military Affairs. 7 vols. Washington: Gales and Seaton, 1832–1860.

Secondary sources
Akil II, Bakari. "Seminoles With African Ancestry: The Right To Heritage", The Black World Today, December 27, 2003.Army and Navy Chronicle. 13 vols. Washington: B. Homans, 1835–1842.
Baram, Uzi. "Cosmopolitan Meanings of Old Spanish Fields: Historical Archaeology of a Maroon Community in Southwest Florida" Historical Archaeology 46(1):108-122. 2012
Baram, Uzi. "Many Histories by the Manatee Mineral Spring". Time Sifters Archaeological Society Newsletter March 2014. 
Brown, Canter. "Race Relations in Territorial Florida, 1821–1845." Florida Historical Quarterly 73.3 (January 1995): 287–307.
Foreman, Grant. The Five Civilized Tribes. Norman: University of Oklahoma Press, 1934.
Foster, Laurence. Negro-Indian Relations in the Southeast. PhD. Dissertation, University of Pennsylvania, 1935.
Giddings, Joshua R. The Exiles of Florida, or, crimes committed by our government against maroons, who fled from South Carolina and other slave states, seeking protection under Spanish laws. Columbus, Ohio: Follet, 1858.
Goggin, John M. "The Seminole Negroes of Andros Island, Bahamas." Florida Historical Quarterly 24 (July 1946): 201–6.
Hancock, Ian F. The Texas Seminoles and Their Language. Austin: University of Texas Press, 1980.
Indianz.com (2004). "Seminole Freedmen rebuffed by Supreme Court", June 29, 2004.
Kashif, Annette. "Africanisms Upon the Land: A Study of African Influenced Placenames of the USA", In Places of Cultural Memory: African Reflections on the American Landscape. Washington, D.C.: National Park Service, 2001.
Landers, Jane. Black Society in Spanish Florida. Urbana: University of Illinois Press, 1999.
Littlefield, Daniel F., Jr. Africans and Seminoles. Westport, Connecticut: Greenwood Press, 1977.
Mahon, John K. History of the Second Seminole War, 1835–1842. 1967. Gainesville: University Press of Florida, 1985.
Mulroy, Kevin. Freedom on the Border: The Seminole Maroons in Florida, the Indian Territory, Coahuila, and Texas. Lubbock: Texas Tech University Press, 1993.
Mulroy, Kevin. The Seminole Freedmen: A History (Race and Culture in the American West), Norman, Oklahoma: University of Oklahoma Press, 2007.
Porter, Kenneth Wiggins. The Black Seminoles: History of a Freedom-Seeking People. Eds Thomas Senter and Alcione Amos. Gainesville: University of Florida Press, 1996.
Porter, Kenneth Wiggins. The Negro on the American Frontier. New York: Arno Press, 1971.
Rivers, Larry Eugene. Slavery in Florida. Gainesville: University Press of Florida, 2000.
Schneider, Pamela S. It's Not Funny: Various Aspects of Black History Charlotte PA: Lemieux Press Publishers, 2005.
Simmons, William. Notices of East Florida: with an account of the Seminole nation of Indians, 1822. Intro. George E. Buker. Gainesville: University Press of Florida, 1973, available online.
Sturtevant, William C. "Creek into Seminole." North American Indians in Historical Perspective. Eds Eleanor B. Leacock and Nancy O. Lurie. New York: Random House, 1971.
Twyman, Bruce Edward. The Black Seminole Legacy and Northern American Politics, 1693–1845. Washington: Howard University Press, 1999.
Wallace, Ernest. Ranald S. Mackenzie on the Texas Frontier. College Station: Texas A&M University Press, 1993.
Wright, J. Leitch, Jr. Creeks and Seminoles: The Destruction and Regeneration of the Muscogulge People. Lincoln: University of Nebraska Press, 1986.

Further reading
 Hancock, Ian F. "A Provisional Comparison of the English-based Atlantic Creoles", Sierra Leone Language Review, 8 (1969), 7=72.
——— "Gullah and Barbadian: Origins and Relationships." American Speech, 55 (1) (1980), 17–35.
——— The Texas Seminoles and their Language, Austin: University of Texas African and Afro-American Studies and Research Center, Series 2, No. 1, 1980.
Howard, Rosalyn A. black Seminoles in the Bahamas, Gainesville: University of Florida, 2002

Littlefield, Daniel C. Rice and Slaves: Ethnicity and the Slave Trade in Colonial South Carolina, Baton Rouge: Louisiana State University Press, 1981/1991, University of Illinois Press.
Littlefield, Daniel F. Jr. Africans and Seminoles: From Removal to Emancipation, University of Mississippi Press, 1977.
Opala, Joseph A. A Brief History of the Seminole Freedmen, Austin: University of Texas African and Afro-American Studies and Research Center, Series 2, No. 3, 1980.
——— "Seminole-African Relations on the Florida Frontier", Papers in Anthropology (University of Oklahoma), 22 (1) (1981), 11–52.

External links

Bird, J.B (2005). "The Largest Slave Rebellion in U.S. History", Rebellion: John Horse and the black Seminoles Website
Bill Hubbard, "Story of Freedman Caesar Bruner", c. 1958, Seminole Nation of Oklahoma website
Seminole and black Seminole genealogical records, Freepages GenWeb
"Blood Feud", Wired Magazine'', Vol. 13.09, August 2005, article on DNA, ethnicity, and black Seminoles
"black Indians", ColorQWorld
Pilaklikaha at History of Central Florida Podcast
"Tragedy and Survival: Virtual Landscapes of 19th Century Florida Gulf Coast Maroons"

 
African–Native American relations
Gullah
Seminole Wars
Fugitive American slaves